Anatoma indonesica is a species of minute sea snail, a marine gastropod mollusk or micromollusk in the family Anatomidae.

References

 Geiger D.L. (2012) Monograph of the little slit shells. Volume 1. Introduction, Scissurellidae. pp. 1-728. Volume 2. Anatomidae, Larocheidae, Depressizonidae, Sutilizonidae, Temnocinclidae. pp. 729–1291. Santa Barbara Museum of Natural History Monographs Number 7.

External links
 To Encyclopedia of Life
 To World Register of Marine Species

Anatomidae
Gastropods described in 1998